Ralph Stoner Wolfe (July 18, 1921, New Windsor, Maryland – March 26, 2019, Urbana, Illinois) was an American microbiologist, who contributed to the discovery of the single-celled archaea as the third domain of life. He was a pioneer in the biochemistry of methanogenesis.

Biography
Wolfe graduated in 1942 with a bachelor's degree in biology from Bridgewater College, where his father was a teacher. Ralph Wolfe earned a master's degree in bacteriology from the University of Pennsylvania and then worked for several years in a laboratory. He returned to the University of Pennsylvania and graduated there in 1953 with a Ph.D. in bacteriology. In the department of bacteriology at the University of Illinois at Urbana–Champaign, he became an instructor in 1953, an assistant professor in 1955, an associate professor in 1957, and a full professor in 1961, retiring as professor emeritus in 1991.

His 1979 paper written in collaboration with Woese and 3 other microbiologists has over 3,000 citations.

Wolfe was awarded Guggenheim Fellowships for the academic years 1960–1961 and 1975–1976. In 1981, he was elected to the National Academy of Sciences, as well as the American Academy of Arts and Sciences. In 1995, the National Academy of Sciences gave him the Selman A. Waksman Award in Microbiology for "elucidating the biochemical pathway of the reduction of carbon dioxide to methane in microorganisms and in the course of this work defining new biochemical pathways, enzymes, and cofactors." The American Society of Microbiology gave hime three awards.

He married Gretka Young in September 1950. Upon his death he was survived by his widow, a daughter, two sons, four grandchildren, and one great-grandchild.

Selected publications

References

External links

1921 births
2019 deaths
People from New Windsor, Maryland
American bacteriologists
American microbiologists
Bridgewater College alumni
Perelman School of Medicine at the University of Pennsylvania alumni
University of Illinois Urbana-Champaign faculty
Members of the United States National Academy of Sciences